Golden Falls hydroelectric power station is a hydroelectric plant located on the River Liffey in County Kildare, Ireland. It is owned and operated by the ESB Group.

Construction

Golden Falls hydroelectric plant is located downstream of the larger Pollaphuca hydroelectric power station as part of the River Liffey Scheme. The dam creates a balancing reservoir between the plant and the larger one upstream and has helped to reduce the risk of flooding.

Generating capacity
The plant consists of a single turbine rated at  manufactured by English Electric. It spins at 187.5 r.p.m. and feeds a 5,000 kVA English Electric three phase alternator running at 10.5 kV.  The average output for the station is 9 GWh a year.

Archaeological importance
The Bronze Age Bishopsland Hoard was excavated during the construction of the dam in 1942 and subsequently other archaeological finds from periods back to the Neolithic have been found in the area.

References

Hydroelectric power stations in the Republic of Ireland
Gravity dams
Dams completed in 1943